A radiant or radiate crown, also known as a solar crown, sun crown, Eastern crown, or tyrant's crown, is a crown, wreath, diadem, or other headgear symbolizing the sun or more generally powers associated with the sun. Apart from the Ancient Egyptian form of a disc between two horns, it is shaped with a number of narrowing bands going outwards from the wearer's head, to represent the rays of the sun.  These may be represented either as flat, on the same plane as the circlet of the crown, or rising at right angles to it.

History
In the iconography of ancient Egypt, the solar crown is taken as a disc framed by the horns of a ram or cow. It is worn by deities such as Horus in his solar or hawk-headed form, Hathor, and Isis. It may also be worn by pharaohs.

In Ptolemaic Egypt, the solar crown could also be a radiate diadem, modeled after the type worn by Alexander the Great (as identified with the sun god Helios) in art from the mid-2nd century BC onward. It was perhaps influenced by contact with the Shunga Empire, and a Greco-Bactrian example is depicted at the great stupa of Bharhut. The first ruler of Egypt shown wearing this version of a solar crown was Ptolemy III Euergetes (246–222 BC).

In the Roman Empire, the solar crown was worn by Roman emperors, especially in association with the cult of Sol Invictus, influenced also by radiate depictions of Alexander.  Although Augustus is shown wearing one in a posthumous coin, after his deification, and Nero on at least one coin while he was alive, it only became common, and sometimes usual, on coins in the 3rd century.  Histories record that Gallienus at least wore an actual crown in public.  The solar crown worn by Constantine, the first emperor to convert to Christianity, was reinterpreted as representing the "Holy Nails".

Much later, the radiate crown became associated with Liberty personified, usually in a form as though a circular disc with radiating rays in different directions was worn. This may first appear in the Great Seal of France from 1848 (and under subsequent French republics), and is best known from the Statue of Liberty.  From the Renaissance on the ancient Colossus of Rhodes, a statue of Helios, was often shown with such a crown, although its appearance is now uncertain.

See also
 Crown of justification
 Crown of thorns
 Crowns of Egypt
 Halo
 Horned deity

Notes

References

 
 
 
 
 

Crowns (headgear)
Sun myths
Sol Invictus
Helios